Lowell is an unincorporated community and census-designated place (CDP) in southeastern Henry County, Iowa, United States. It was first listed as a CDP prior to the 2020 census.

Demographics

Location
The community is located in Baltimore Township, along the Skunk River. Lowell is at the intersection of New London and Salem Roads, south of New London.

History
The village was laid out by a man named McCarver. At one time, Lowell had Presbyterian and Methodist congregations, two fraternal lodges, two gristmills, and five sawmills. The relatively large number of sawmills was due to Baltimore Township being two-thirds timber. The first mill in town was established by Major Smith and Thomas Angel in 1838.

Lowell's population in 1915 was 105.

References

Census-designated places in Henry County, Iowa
Census-designated places in Iowa
Unincorporated communities in Henry County, Iowa
Unincorporated communities in Iowa